The 2007 Girabola was the 29th season of the top-tier football league in Angola. The season ran from 14 February to 21 October 2007. Primeiro de Agosto were the defending champions.

The league comprised 14 teams, the bottom three of which were relegated to the 2008 Gira Angola.

Petro Atlético de Luanda were crowned champions, while Académica do Soyo, Atlético do Namibe and Juventude do Moxico were relegated. Manucho Gonçalves of Petro de Luanda finished as the top scorer with 14 goals.

Changes from the 2006 season
Relegated: Bravos do Maquis, Progresso do Sambizanga, Sporting de Cabinda 
Promoted: Juventude do Moxico, Petro do Huambo, Santos FC

League table

Results

Season statistics

Top scorers

Hat-tricks

References

External links
Girabola 2007 standings at girabola.com
Federação Angolana de Futebol

2007 in Angolan football
Girabola seasons
Angola
Angola